Alan Minshaw (born 17 May 1935) is a British former racing driver. In 1983 he won Class C and finished second overall in the British Saloon Car Championship in a Volkswagen Golf GTi. 

As of 2012, Minshaw owned a varied collection of historic racing vehicles, and regularly competed alongside his sons.

Racing record

Complete British Saloon / Touring Car Championship results
(key) (Races in bold indicate pole position) (Races in italics indicate fastest lap – 1 point awarded ?–1989 in class)

† Events with 2 races staged for the different classes.

‡ Guest driver - not eligible for points.

References

External links
Alan Minshaw at driver database
Top Racing Firm in Multi-million Buyout - Liverpool Daily Post

1935 births
Living people
British Touring Car Championship drivers
Automotive part retailers
Retail companies established in 1973
Automotive motorsports and performance companies
Vehicle modification people
British GT Championship teams